Braunsia is a genus of insects belonging to the family Braconidae.

The species of this genus are found in Europe, Far East, Africa and Australia.

It contains 70 species:
 Braunsia analis Kriechbaumer, 1894
 Braunsia angulosa Bhat & Gupta, 1977

References

Braconidae
Braconidae genera